The Secret Value of Daydreaming is the second studio album by singer-songwriter Julian Lennon.

Background and recording
After going on tour the previous year to promote his previous album, Valotte, Lennon took a break to write material for The Secret Value of Daydreaming. Recording took place in the Bahamas, at Compass Point Studios, with mixing at the Hit Factory in New York City.

Release

The Secret Value of Daydreaming was released on 24 March 1986 on Charisma in the UK, and a day later on the 25th on Atlantic in the US. The album peaked at number 32 on the Billboard 200 chart upon its release. It was certified gold for sales of over 500,000 copies in the US by the RIAA on 22 May 1986. "Stick Around" reached number 1 on Billboard's Mainstream Rock Tracks chart, and number 32 on their Hot 100 chart.

Musician reviewer J. D. Considine wrote simply: "At least he got his father's looks."

The album was reissued, along with Mr. Jordan and Help Yourself, on 8 September 2009 by Noble Rot Records.

Track listing
All songs written by Julian Lennon, except where noted.

Side one
"Stick Around" – 3:39
"You Get What You Want" – 4:04
"Let Me Tell You" – 4:16
"I've Seen Your Face" – 3:27
"Coward Till the End?" – 6:11 (Julian Lennon, Justin Clayton)

Side two
"This Is My Day" – 3:51
"You Don't Have to Tell Me" – 4:55
"Every Day" – 3:51 (Lennon, Clayton, Carlton Morales)
"Always Think Twice" – 3:56
"Want Your Body" – 3:25

Music videos
"Stick Around" - features appearances by Jami Gertz, Michael J. Fox, Joe Piscopo and Martin Kove.
"This Is My Day" - The second single and video to promote the album. The mix of the song is unique to the video, as the version that appears on the album is different. The video mix is available on Lennon's compilation Behind the Music. The single itself failed to chart.
"Want Your Body" -  The final video and single for the album; also failed to chart.

Personnel 
Musicians
 Julian Lennon – lead vocals, backing vocals, acoustic piano, keyboards, bass, drum programming
 Chuck Kentis – keyboards
 Billy Joel – acoustic piano (2)
 David Brown – guitars
 Justin Clayton – guitars
 John McCurry – guitars
 Carmine Rojas – bass 
 Alan Childs – drums
 Jimmy Bralower – percussion
 Frank Elmo – horns
 Rory Dodd – backing vocals
 Fiona Flanagan – backing vocals
 Peter Hewlett – backing vocals
 Karen Kamon – backing vocals
 Eric Taylor – backing vocals

Production
 Phil Ramone – producer
 Joseph D'Ambrosio – production coordinator 
 Bradshaw Leigh – engineer
 Sean Burrows – associate engineer 
 Peter Hefter – associate engineer
 Barry Diament – CD mastering and  remastering at Atlantic Studios (New York, NY).
 Ted Jensen – LP mastering at Sterling Sound (New York, NY).
 Timothy White – cover photography 
 Bob Defrin – art direction 
 Julian Lennon – design concept

Charts

Weekly charts

Year-end charts

Certifications

References

1986 albums
Julian Lennon albums
Albums produced by Phil Ramone
Atlantic Records albums
Charisma Records albums